Andrew Brown (born December 30, 1995) is an American football defensive end for the Chicago Bears of the National Football League (NFL). He played college football at Virginia. Brown was a two-time High School All-American at Oscar F. Smith High School in Chesapeake, Virginia. He has played for the Cincinnati Bengals, Houston Texans and Arizona Cardinals.

High school career 
A native of Chesapeake, Virginia, Brown initially attended Indian River High School for his freshman and sophomore year. He transferred to Oscar Smith his junior year. At Oscar Smith, Brown further developed into one of the most sought-after prospects in the country. After posting 83 tackles and 11 sacks in 2012, he was named a First-team All-American by USA Today, a rare feat for a junior.

In his senior year, Brown recorded 93 tackles, 30 for a loss, 18 sacks and forced nine fumbles. Oscar Smith went undefeated into the 2013 VHSL 6A state championship game, where they were upset by Centreville High School 35-6. Brown repeated as USA Today All-American and also was named the Gatorade High School Football Player of the Year in 2013.

Regarded as a five-star recruit, Brown was ranked as the number one defensive tackle in his class. He committed to the University of Virginia.

College career
Brown played for the Cavaliers from 2014 through 2017. During the 2017 season, he played in the Military Bowl and was invited to the 2018 Senior Bowl.

Professional career

Cincinnati Bengals
Brown was drafted by the Cincinnati Bengals in the fifth round, 158th overall, of the 2018 NFL Draft. He was waived on September 1, 2018, and was signed to the practice squad the next day. He signed a reserve/future contract with the Bengals on January 2, 2019.

In Week 4 of the 2020 season against the Jacksonville Jaguars, Brown recorded his first career sack on Gardner Minshew during the 33–25 win.  He was waived on October 19, 2020, and re-signed to the practice squad two days later.

Houston Texans
On November 25, 2020, Brown was signed off the Bengals' practice squad by the Houston Texans. He was waived on March 16, 2021.

Indianapolis Colts
Brown was claimed off waivers by the Colts on March 17, 2021. He was waived on August 31, 2021 and re-signed to the practice squad the next day. He was released on September 7.

Tennessee Titans
On September 22, 2021, Brown signed with the Tennessee Titans' practice squad. He was released on September 28.

Los Angeles Chargers
On October 5, 2021, Brown was signed to the Los Angeles Chargers practice squad. He signed a reserve/future contract with the Chargers on January 11, 2022.

On August 30, 2022, Brown was waived by the Chargers.

Arizona Cardinals
On September 2, 2022, Brown was signed to the Arizona Cardinals practice squad.

Chicago Bears
On November 30, 2022, Brown was signed by the Chicago Bears off the Cardinals practice squad.

References

External links 
 Virginia Cavaliers bio

1995 births
Living people
American football defensive tackles
Arizona Cardinals players
Chicago Bears players
Cincinnati Bengals players
Houston Texans players
Indianapolis Colts players
Los Angeles Chargers players
Players of American football from Virginia
Sportspeople from Chesapeake, Virginia
Tennessee Titans players
Virginia Cavaliers football players